The Russellville Masonic Temple, also known as Russellville City Hall, is a clubhouse and municipal building at 205 South Commerce Street in Russellville, Arkansas. Built in 1926, it is a Classical Revival building.  It was listed on the National Register of Historic Places in 2005.

The edifice was constructed as a Masonic temple, with the first floor rented to the city for use as the City Hall. In 1943, the city bought the building, paid off the mortgage, and rented the second floor to the Masons. As of 2001, the Masons were preparing to vacate the second floor.

See also
National Register of Historic Places listings in Pope County, Arkansas

References

External links
  Arkansas Historic Preservation Program NRHP nomination summary for Russellville Masonic Temple

Clubhouses on the National Register of Historic Places in Arkansas
Neoclassical architecture in Arkansas
Masonic buildings completed in 1926
Buildings and structures in Russellville, Arkansas
Former Masonic buildings in Arkansas
National Register of Historic Places in Pope County, Arkansas
City halls in Arkansas
1926 establishments in Arkansas